Lung Sheung is one of the 25 constituencies of the Wong Tai Sin District Council. The seat elects one member of the council every four years. The boundary is loosely based on the area of Upper Wong Tai Sin Estate.

Councillors represented

Election results

2010s

2000s

1990s

References

External links 
2011 District Council Election Results (Wong Tai Sin)
2007 District Council Election Results (Wong Tai Sin)
2003 District Council Election Results (Wong Tai Sin)
1999 District Council Election Results (Wong Tai Sin)

Wong Tai Sin
Constituencies of Hong Kong
Constituencies of Wong Tai Sin District Council
1999 establishments in Hong Kong
Constituencies established in 1999